This list of German rail accidents contains those train wrecks which happened in Germany, including
 German states before 1871 (excluding Austria)
 German Reich
 Allied-occupied Germany
 Federal Republic of Germany
 German Democratic Republic

List

References 

Germany